Patricia Sentous (born 19 March 1950) is an Argentine former swimmer. She competed in two events at the 1968 Summer Olympics.

References

1950 births
Living people
Argentine female swimmers
Olympic swimmers of Argentina
Swimmers at the 1968 Summer Olympics
Swimmers from Buenos Aires